The Senior men's race at the 1977 IAAF World Cross Country Championships was held in Düsseldorf, West Germany, at the Galopprennbahn Düsseldorf-Grafenberg on March 20, 1977.   A report on the event was given in the Glasgow Herald.

Complete results, medallists, 
 and the results of British athletes were published.

Race results

Senior men's race (12.3 km)

Individual

Teams

Note: Athletes in parentheses did not score for the team result

Participation
An unofficial count yields the participation of 168 athletes from 21 countries in the Senior men's race.  This is in agreement with the official numbers as published.

 (9)
 (9)
 (6)
 (9)
 (6)
 (9)
 (9)
 (7)
 (8)
 (9)
 (9)
 (9)
 (9)
 (9)
 (2)
 (8)
 (7)
 (8)
 (9)
 (9)
 (8)

See also
 1977 IAAF World Cross Country Championships – Junior men's race
 1977 IAAF World Cross Country Championships – Senior women's race

References

Senior men's race at the World Athletics Cross Country Championships
IAAF World Cross Country Championships